Lewis Baker may refer to:

Lewis Baker (politician) (1832–1899), West Virginia politician and diplomat
Lewis Baker (gridiron football) (born 1984), American football player for the San Francisco 49ers
Lewis Baker (slugger) (c. 1825–?), American police officer employed as a "slugger" for Tammany Hall
Lewis Baker (footballer) (born 1995), English footballer
Lewis Baker (cricketer) (1920–1997), New Zealand cricketer

See also
Louis Baker, musician